Following is a List of senators of Tarn, people who have represented the department of Tarn in the Senate of France.

Third Republic 

Étienne de Voisins-Lavernière (1876–1881), then inamovible from 1881–1898
Sylvain Espinasse (1879–1882)
Pascal Rigal (1882–1889)
Édouard Barbey (1882–1905)
Bertrand Lavergne (1889–1900)
Adrien Gay de Savary (1898–1927)
Louis Boularan (1900–1909)
Louis Vieu (1905–1931)
Paul Gouzy (1909–1919)
Édouard Andrieu (1920–1936)
Pierre Loubat (1927–1940)
Fernand Lavergne (1931–1940)
Laurent Camboulives (1936–1940)

Fourth Republic

Marcel Grimal (1946–1952)
François Monsarrat (1952–1959)
Fernand Verdeille (1946–1959)

Fifth Republic

François Monsarrat (1959–1968)
Fernand Verdeille (1959–1974)
Louis Brives (1968–1995)
Frédéric Bourguet (1974–1977)
Georges Spénale (1977–1983)
Jacques Durand (1983–1986)
François Delga (1986–1995)
Georges Mazars (1995–1998)
Roger Lagorsse (1998–2004)
 Jacqueline Alquier (PS) (2004–2014)
 Jean-Marc Pastor (PS) (1995–2014)
 Philippe Bonnecarrère from 2014
 Thierry Carcenac from 2014

References

 
Tarn